Ettel is a surname. Notable people with the surname include:

Friedrich Ettel (1890–1941), Swiss actor
Wolf-Udo Ettel (1921–1943), German World War II pilot

See also
Ettl